Garadagh is a settlement and raion in Baku, Azerbaijan. It has a population of 109,400.

Municipalities
It contains the municipalities of Alat, Cheyildagh, Korgoz,  Lokbatan, Mushfigabad, Puta, Qızıldaş, Gobustan, Sahil, Umid and Sangachal.

References 

Districts of Baku